Soldiers' Monument (Worcester, Massachusetts) is an American Civil War monument on Worcester Common in Worcester, Massachusetts.

Designed by sculptor Randolph Rogers, it consists of a tapering granite Corinthian column crowned by a bronze goddess of Victory, a three-tiered granite pedestal adorned with bronze plaques, buttresses surmounted by four bronze statues representing branches of the military – Artillery, Cavalry, Infantry, Navy – with the whole resting upon a rough granite base flanked by four buried cannons barrels.

The pedestal's top tier is adorned with four relief plaques: the City of Worcester seal, the Massachusetts state seal, the United States seal, and a pair of crossed swords encircled by a laurel wreath. The middle tier features relief busts of U.S. President Abraham Lincoln and Massachusetts Governor John A. Andrew, a battle scene of a dying soldier supported by a comrade, and the monument's dedication plaque. The bottom tier features four inscription plaques listing the names of the 398 Worcester soldiers who died in the war.

In 1871, the Soldiers' Monument Committee commissioned Rogers to design the memorial. The City of Worcester appropriated $35,000, and an addition $15,000 was raised by subscription. The monument was dedicated on July 15, 1874.

The ground level was raised in 1969, burying the rough-granite base, so the monument is now approximately  shorter.

Dedication Plaque:

External links
Worcester Civil War Monument on "Massachusetts Civil War Monuments Project"
Soldiers' Monument from Smithsonian Institution Research Information System.
Dedication of the Soldiers' Monument at Worcester, Massachusetts: July 15, A.D. 1874. from Google.

1874 establishments in Massachusetts
1874 sculptures
Bronze sculptures in Massachusetts
Buildings and structures completed in 1874
Buildings and structures in Worcester, Massachusetts
Culture of Worcester, Massachusetts
Granite sculptures in Massachusetts
Landmarks in Worcester, Massachusetts
Sculptures of women in Massachusetts
Statues in Massachusetts
Union (American Civil War) monuments and memorials in Massachusetts